Borovnica, which translates as Blueberry from Serbo-Croatian, may refer to:

Borovnica, Prozor, a village in Bosnia and Herzegovina
Borovnica, Zavidovići, a village in Bosnia and Herzegovina
Borovnica, Slovenia
Municipality of Borovnica